The 2002 Illinois State Redbirds football team represented Illinois State University as a member of the Gateway Football Conference during the 2002 NCAA Division I-AA football season. The team was led by third-year head coach Denver Johnson and played their home games at Hancock Stadium in Normal, Illinois. The Redbirds finished the season with an overall record of 6–5 and a record of 4–3 in conference play, tying for third place in the Gateway.

Schedule

References

Illinois State
Illinois State Redbirds football seasons
Illinois State Redbirds football